The Sauro  class were a group of four destroyers built for the  (Royal Italian Navy) in the late 1920s. They were based in the Red Sea Italian colony of Eritrea and all fought in World War II being sunk during the East African Campaign in 1941.

Design and description
The Sauro-class destroyers were enlarged and improved versions of the preceding . Their complement was 8–10 officers and 146 enlisted men.

The Sauros were powered by two Parsons geared steam turbines, each driving one propeller shaft using steam supplied by three Yarrow boilers.

Their main battery consisted of four  guns in two twin-gun turrets, one each fore and aft of the superstructure. Anti-aircraft (AA) defense for the Sauro-class ships was provided by a pair of  AA guns in single mounts amidships and a pair of  machine guns. They were equipped with six  torpedo tubes in two triple mounts amidships. The Sauros could also carry 52 mines.

Ships
These ships formed the 3rd Squadrilla and were based in the Red Sea.

Operational history

The destroyers were outfitted for colonial service, and by 1935 they were deployed in the naval base of Massawa, Eritrea. Italian's entry in World War II left Italian East Africa isolated from Italy.

Attack on convoy BN 7
The only appreciable action in which the destroyers were involved was the attack on the Allied convoy BN 7, on the first hours of 21 October 1940. The attack was nevertheless repulsed by the cruiser HMS Leander, which fired 129 six-inch rounds on the Italian destroyers. While Sauro and the other destroyers successfully disengaged, Nullo was chased by the destroyer  and forced to run aground on Harmil island, where she was later wrecked by RAF Blenheim bombers. Kimberley took two hits on a boiler from coastal batteries, and had to be towed to Aden by HMS Leander.

End of the surviving units
The three surviving destroyers remained at dock in Massawa until the very end of ground operations in East Africa. Their commander ordered them to steam out on 2 April 1941, for an almost suicidal attack on Port Sudan. The squadron was soon discovered by British air reconnaissance, and immediately bombed by land-based Swordfish aircraft from the aircraft carrier . Battisti managed to reach the Arabian coast, where she was scuttled by her crew. Manin and Sauro kept firing their antiaircraft guns until they were sunk by the British planes.

Notes

Bibliography

External links
 Classe Sauro Marina Militare website

 
Destroyer classes
Destroyers of the Regia Marina
Ships built in Italy